Bengbu Airport  is a dual-use (military and civil) airport in Bengbu, Anhui Province, China.

History
Originally, the Bengbu Airport was located very close to Bengbu's urban area. As the city grew, this created an unacceptable situation both for the city's development and for the flight safety. By 1995, the city government decided to try to have the airport relocated. After some years of negotiation, an agreement was reached between the Anhui provincial government and the Nanjing Military Region to construct a new airport elsewhere and to release the old airport site for city development.

In 1997, land acquisition for the new airport started, and in May 1998, 4030 mu (2.69 square km) of land near Renheji village in Qinji Township was dedicated for the new airport. The site is within 8 km straight-line distance from downtown Bengbu, or 11 km by road.

In August 2002, the new airport was opened for military use. Provisions for future civilian use are made as well, but construction on the civilian-use facilities is yet to start.

See also
List of airports in China
List of the busiest airports in China
List of People's Liberation Army Air Force airbases

References

Defunct airports in China
Airports in Anhui
Chinese Air Force bases
Bengbu